Tamara Bösch (born 5 June 1989 in Lustenau) is an Austrian handballer who plays for HC Leipzig and the Austrian national team.

Achievements
Swiss Championship:
Winner: 2009, 2011
Swiss Cup:
Winner: 2009, 2010

References

External links
 Profile on the Austrian Handball Federation official website

1989 births
Living people
Austrian female handball players
Austrian expatriate sportspeople in Germany
Expatriate handball players
Austrian expatriate sportspeople in Switzerland
Sportspeople from Vorarlberg
People from Lustenau